Qusha Bolagh (also Romanized as Qūshā Bolāgh; also known as Qūsheh Bolāgh) is a village in Chaman Rural District, Takht-e Soleyman District, Takab County, West Azerbaijan Province, Iran. At the 2006 census, its population was 172, in 36 families.

References 

Populated places in Takab County